The 7.7 cm Infanteriegeschütz L/27 was an infantry gun used by Germany in World War I. It was intended to replace the 7.7 cm Infanteriegeschütz L/20, but only saw limited service.

It was another variant of the 7.7 cm FK 96 n.A. using the tube, breech and carriage of the older gun. The carriage was modified with smaller wheels set closer together and lacked the crew seats and lower part of the shield. It was transported in two loads.

Only enough guns for eighteen batteries had been ordered and delivered in the Spring of 1917 as the Germans continued their search for the ideal infantry gun by ordering the Austrian Skoda 7.5 cm Gebirgskanone 15.

Gallery

References 

 Jäger, Herbert. German Artillery of World War One. Ramsbury, Marlborough, Wiltshire: Crowood Press, 2001 

World War I artillery of Germany
World War I infantry guns
77 mm artillery